29 Cancri is a star in the zodiac constellation of Cancer, located 370 light years from the Sun. It is just visible to the naked eye as a dim, white-hued star with an apparent visual magnitude of 5.94. The star is situated near the ecliptic, which means it is subject to lunar occultations.

This is an A-type main-sequence star with a stellar classification of A5 V, which indicates it is generating energy through hydrogen fusion at its core. It has 2.3 times the mass of the Sun and around 1.9 times the Sun's radius. The star has a relatively high rate of rotation, showing a projected rotational velocity of 117 km/s. It is radiating 45 times the Sun's luminosity from its photosphere at an effective temperature of 7,727 K.

References

A-type main-sequence stars
Cancer (constellation)
Durchmusterung objects
Cancri, 29
071555
041578
3333